Cypa decolor is a species of moth of the family Sphingidae first described by Francis Walker in 1856.

Distribution 
It is found in northeastern India, Nepal, Myanmar, southwestern China, Thailand, Vietnam, Malaysia (Sarawak) and Indonesia (Sumatra, Borneo, Kalimantan, Papua New Guinea).

Description 
The wingspan is 50–82 mm. The males tend to be more variegated than the females. It is similar to Cypa terranea but is greener brown above.

Biology 
The larvae feed on Quercus and Castanopsis species.

Subspecies
Cypa decolor decolor (north-eastern India, Nepal, Myanmar, southwestern China, Thailand, Vietnam, Malaysia (Sarawak) and Indonesia (Sumatra, Borneo, Kalimantan))
Cypa decolor euroa Rothschild & Jordan, 1903 (Papua New Guinea)

References

Cypa
Moths described in 1856